On 7 August 1995, two Croatian Air Force MiG-21 planes fired several rockets at a Serb refugee column on Petrovačka Cesta road near Bosanski Petrovac, Bosnia and Herzegovina, killing 9 civilians and injuring more than 50. On 8 August 1995, another attack took place, resulting in more civilian casualties. The victims were traveling in a refugee column fleeing Croatia during Operation Storm which brought about an end to the Croatian War of Independence.

Background

By March 1991, tensions between Croats and Serbs escalated into the Croatian War of Independence. Following a referendum on independence that was largely boycotted by Croatian Serbs, the Croatian parliament officially adopted independence on 25 June. The Republic of Serb Krajina (RSK) declared its intention to secede from Croatia and join the Republic of Serbia while the Government of the Republic of Croatia declared it a rebellion. RSK forces and paramilitaries went on to expel Croats and other non-Serbs from areas where they established control. Meanwhile, Serbs living in Croatian towns, especially near the front lines were subjected to various forms of harassment and attacks.

On 4 August 1995, the Croatian Army, together with the 5th Corps of the Army of the Republic of Bosnia and Herzegovina, launched Operation Storm to regain control of occupied territories of Croatia, and to end the Siege of Bihać. Around 200,000 Serbs fled towards Serbia. The columns of Serb civilians escaping through the town of Dvor came under repeated attack from artillery shelling and small arms fire from both Croatian and Bosnian troops, leading to civilian deaths. UN troops reported the same column came under attack from Croatian fighter jets.

Events
On 7 August, two Croatian Air Force MiG-21 planes fired several rockets at a Serb refugee column on Petrovačka Cesta road near Bosanski Petrovac, killing 9 civilians and injuring more than 50. The victims included four children. The columns of refugees had arrived on the territory of Bosnia and Herzegovina from Lika and Dalmatia, and Kordun and Banija. According to the testimonies of survivors, there were no military vehicles or army units in the column, only civilians who were fleeing. However, RSK forces would also sometimes be intermingled with fleeing civilians. Some Krajina Serb soldiers who were interviewed by Human Rights Watch stated that they transported ammunition and weaponry to Bosnian Serb authorities.

On 8 August, another refugee convoy was shelled near the village of Svodna, also in Bosnia, resulting in civilian casualties.

Aftermath and reactions
A 1996 report by Human Rights Watch detailing abuses committed during Operation Storm listed bombings of refugee columns by Croatian aircraft on "at least three separate occasions". It noted that the attacks would constitute violations of the Geneva conventions and a war crime if civilians had been directly attacked but that if military personnel had been mixed in and if incidental fighting occurred which resulted in civilian casualties, it could be considered collateral damage.

In 2003 at the ICTY while under cross-examination by Slobodan Milošević, it was revealed that General Janko Bobetko, former Chief of the General Staff of the Croatian Army accused Imra Agotić, first commander of the Croatian Air Force and Defence of ordering the bombing of the refugee column. Agotić denied any involvement.

In 2012, the Croatian journal Magazine for Military History (Vojna Povijest) published flight logs of Croatian fighter planes from 3 August to 8 August 1995. It described the destruction of military vehicles on 7 August and 8 August in the area near Bosanski Petrovac and Svodna, respectively. These accounts are disputed by the Serbian NGO Veritas and others who note that the magazine makes no mention of civilian casualties or the fact that civilian vehicles were destroyed. Meanwhile, former Minister of Foreign Affairs of Croatia Mate Granić confirmed that Croatian planes struck convoys but claimed that it was a legitimate target against members of the Krajina Serb military, calling the civilian casualties "collateral damage".

On 1 November 2010, the Ministry of Internal Affairs of Republika Srpska submitted reports and evidence to the Prosecutor's Office of Bosnia and Herzegovina against three officers and two pilots of the Croatian Army. The events received renewed publicity in June 2022 when Serbia filed indictments against four Croatian Army officers it alleges were involved in the bombings. One of them is fighter squadron commander Danijel Borovic who was the only one of the named in 2010 to be still alive. The Croatian War Ministry responded to the indictments by issuing a statement rejecting Serbian jurisdiction over the matter. Croatian Prime Minister Andrej Plenković said that the government would protect the pilots and called the Serbian indictment "a step backward in reconciliation".

References

1995 in Croatia
Massacres in 1995
Croatian war crimes in the Croatian War of Independence
Mass murder in 1995
Massacres in Croatia
August 1995 events in Europe
1995 crimes in Croatia
1995 murders in Europe
1990s murders in Croatia
Massacres of Serbs
Massacres in the Croatian War of Independence